Mitchell Farmer (born 4 January 1989) is a former Australian rules footballer who played with both the Richmond Tigers and Port Adelaide Power in the Australian Football League (AFL).

The back pocket player is quick, durable and aggressive. He was in the top 10 in the vertical leap at the AFL Draft Camp, played for Vic Metro at Under-18 level and captained the Calder Cannons in their TAC Cup Grand Final win in 2007.

Farmer was selected by Port Adelaide in the 2007 AFL draft using their fourth and last pick, the 49th selection overall.

He was traded to Richmond along with draft pick 71 at the end of the 2009 season, in exchange for Jay Schulz.

Farmer played 28 games for Richmond before being delisted at the end of the 2011 season.

References

External links

Port Adelaide Football Club players
Port Adelaide Football Club players (all competitions)
Richmond Football Club players
1989 births
Living people
Australian rules footballers from Victoria (Australia)
Calder Cannons players
Coburg Football Club players